Anchi ware (庵地焼) is a type of Japanese pottery traditionally made in Agano, Niigata prefecture.

References

External links 
 http://www.anchiyaki.jp

Culture in Niigata Prefecture
Japanese pottery